Luis Alberto Torrecilla Michelle (born March 18, 1989) is a Uruguayan footballer who plays for Club Atlético Cinco Esquinas (Pando ) Cinco Esquinas Pando.

Career
Torrecilla began his career in 2009 with River Plate Montevideo, where he played for six seasons, until now.

References

External links
 
 

1989 births
Living people
Uruguayan footballers
Club Atlético River Plate (Montevideo) players
Association football defenders
Uruguayan Primera División players